Cirrus castellanus or Cirrus castellatus is a species of cirrus cloud. Its name comes from the word castellanus, which means of a fort, of a castle in Latin. Like all cirrus, this species occurs at high altitudes. It appears as separate turrets rising from a lower-level cloud base. Often these cloud turrets form in lines, and they can be taller than they are wide. This cloud species is usually dense in formation.

See also
List of cloud types

References

External links
International Cloud Atlas - Cirrus fibratus

Cirrus